François Doubin (April 23, 1933 – June 18, 2019) was a French politician and cabinet minister. He was a member and leader of the Radical Party of the Left.

President of the Left Radical Movement (MRG) between 1985 and 1988, he became Delegate Minister for Commerce and Handicrafts and later Delegate Minister for Crafts, Commerce and Consumers in the Michel Rocard government between 1988 and 1992.

He was Mayor of Argentan between 1989 and 2001 and Lower Normandy regional councillor between 1998 and 2004.

References

1933 births
2019 deaths
Radical Party of the Left politicians
Mayors of places in Normandy
People from Argentan
21st-century French politicians
Politicians from Normandy
20th-century French politicians
École nationale d'administration alumni
Officiers of the Légion d'honneur